Krastana Stoeva (3 January 1941 – 2004) was a Bulgarian cross-country skier. She competed at the 1960 Winter Olympics and the 1964 Winter Olympics.

References

External links
 

1941 births
2004 deaths
Bulgarian female cross-country skiers
Olympic cross-country skiers of Bulgaria
Cross-country skiers at the 1960 Winter Olympics
Cross-country skiers at the 1964 Winter Olympics
People from Smolyan
Universiade bronze medalists for Bulgaria
Universiade medalists in cross-country skiing
Competitors at the 1964 Winter Universiade
Competitors at the 1966 Winter Universiade